Jaouad Syoud (born 17 September 1999) is an Algerian swimmer. He is a two-time gold medalist at the African Games.

Career 

He competed in the men's 200 metre individual medley event at the 2018 FINA World Swimming Championships (25 m) held in Hangzhou, China.

He also represented Algeria at the 2019 World Aquatics Championships in Gwangju, South Korea in the 200 metre individual medley and 400 metre individual medley events.

He also competed in swimming at the 2019 African Games held in Morocco. He won two gold medals and two bronze medals.

He represented Algeria at the 2022 Mediterranean Games held in Oran, Algeria. In total, he won one gold, one silver and one bronze medal.

Major Results

Individual

Long course

Short course

Relay

Long course
Arab Championship , Abu Dhabi 2021

References 

1999 births
Living people
Place of birth missing (living people)
Algerian male swimmers
African Games medalists in swimming
African Games gold medalists for Algeria
African Games bronze medalists for Algeria
Swimmers at the 2019 African Games
Male butterfly swimmers
Algerian male freestyle swimmers
21st-century Algerian people
Swimmers at the 2022 Mediterranean Games
Mediterranean Games gold medalists for Algeria
Mediterranean Games silver medalists for Algeria
Mediterranean Games bronze medalists for Algeria
Mediterranean Games medalists in swimming